Forestville is a formerly unincorporated community in Wake County, North Carolina, United States, east of Falls at an elevation of 390 feet or 119 m.  It currently lies within the town of Wake Forest, south of the intersection of NC 98 (Dr. Calvin Jones Highway) and US 1 Alternate (South Main Street).

References

 

Unincorporated communities in Wake County, North Carolina
Unincorporated communities in North Carolina